Clarence District Cricket Club (CDCC) is a Grade level cricket club representing the city of Clarence in Tasmania's Grade Cricket Competition.

CDCC are based at, and play their home games at Bellerive Oval, Hobart's Test Cricket ground, although it is often required for first class cricket, forcing the club to play many 'away' games. Clarence District Cricket Club have strong affiliations with the Clarence Roos football club, whom they share Bellerive Oval with.

CDCC celebrated their 50th anniversary in 2006. CDCC were at their most dominant in the 1980s, when the team won 8 of their 11 titles including two "4-in-a-row's".

Clarence have been TCA Premiers 11 times despite only joining the competition in 1956 and not winning their first title for 26 years, making them currently sixth on the overall winners list.

Currently the club field teams in the first, second and third grades of the TCA competition, as well as a team in the Southern Tasmanian Cricket League.  There are also a large number of junior teams.

Honours
TCA Premierships: (13) 1981–82,1982–83,1983–84,1984–85,1987–88,1988–89,1989–90,1990–91,1994–95,2002–2003,2003–2004,2011–12,2017–18

External links
 CDCC Website

Tasmanian grade cricket clubs
1956 establishments in Australia
Cricket clubs established in 1956
Sport in Hobart
City of Clarence